Pratylenchus mulchandi is a plant pathogenic nematode infecting pearl millet.

References 

mulchandi
Plant pathogenic nematodes
Pearl millet diseases